Rory Hale (born 27 November 1996) is an Irish footballer who plays for Cliftonville in the NIFL Premiership.

Club career

Aston Villa
Hale started his career at Aston Villa, and regularly played in their Under-23s side, and eventually becoming captain. Hale was released by Aston Villa aged 20, and trialled at Sheffield United and West Brom before signing with Galway United.

Galway United
Galway United announced the signing of Hale in August 2017. Hale joined Derry City in January 2018.

Derry City
Hale joined Derry City in January 2018 along with his brother, Ronan. The brothers’ grandfather is Derry City legend Danny Hale.

Crusaders
Hale joined NIFL Premiership side Crusaders in January 2019. His grandfather, Danny, also played for Crusaders, scoring over 100 goals. His great-uncle Gerry also played for the club. In 2019, Rory's brother Ronan also joined. In 2019, Hale won the Irish Cup with the Crues, and was an unused substitute in the final.

Cliftonville
Crusaders’ North Belfast rivals Cliftonville signed Hale in 2021.

International career
In 2014 Hale made two appearances for the Northern Ireland under-19 team. In 2019 he was called up to the Republic of Ireland under-21 team but did not make an appearance.

Honours
Derry City
League of Ireland Cup: 2018

Crusaders
Irish Cup: 2018–19
County Antrim Shield: 2018–19

Cliftonville
Irish League Cup: 2021–22

References

1996 births
Living people
Association footballers from Northern Ireland
Cliftonville F.C. players
Derry City F.C. players
Galway United F.C. players
NIFL Premiership players
Association footballers from Belfast
Crusaders F.C. players
Association football midfielders
League of Ireland players
Republic of Ireland under-21 international footballers